Rathaus is the German word for a seat of local, legislative and/or executive government.

Rathaus may also refer to:

People
 Chris Rathaus (1943–2006), American radio producer
 Karol Rathaus (1895–1954), composer

Stations
 Rathaus (Hamburg U-Bahn station), in Altstadt, Germany
 Rathaus (KVB), an underground tram station in Cologne, Germany
 Rathaus (Nuremberg U-Bahn), on the U1 line in Fürth, Germany
 Rathaus (Vienna U-Bahn), on Line U2 in Austria

Town halls 
 Rathaus Schöneberg, Berlin, Germany
 Rathaus Spandau, Berlin, Germany
 Rotes Rathaus, Berlin, Germany
 Rathaus (Freiburg im Breisgau), Germany, spread over 16 locations
 Hamburg Rathaus, Germany
 Rathaus (Oldenburg), a former town hall in Lower Saxony, Germany
 Technisches Rathaus, a city building in Munich, Germany
 Rathaus Rapperswil, a former town hall in St. Gallen, Switzerland
 Rathaus, Vienna, Austria
 Rathaus Zürich, Switzerland

Other uses 
 Rathaus (Zürich), a quarter in the Altstadt district of Zürich, Switzerland
 Rathaus Bridge, a bridge in Berlin, Germany
 Theater im Rathaus, a theatre in North Rhine-Westphalia, Germany
 Wienbibliothek im Rathaus, a library and archive in Vienna, Austria

See also
 Ratusz, a Polish historic city hall
 Ráðhús Reykjavíkur, Reykjavík's City Hall in Iceland